The men's competition in the bantamweight (– 62 kg) division was held on 5 and 6 November 2011.

Schedule

Medalists

Records

Results

References

(Pages 25, 27, 29 & 31) Start List 
2011 IWF World Championships Results Book Pages 32–34 
Results

2011 World Weightlifting Championships